Pulosari is a volcano at the western end of Java, in Indonesia.

See also 
 List of volcanoes in Indonesia

References 
 

Mountains of Banten
Volcanoes of Banten
Stratovolcanoes of Indonesia